

This is a list of the National Register of Historic Places listings in Mercer County, Ohio.

This is intended to be a complete list of the properties and districts on the National Register of Historic Places in Mercer County, Ohio, United States.  The locations of National Register properties and districts for which the latitude and longitude coordinates are included below, may be seen in an online map.

There are 30 properties and districts listed on the National Register in the county.

Current listings

|}

See also
 List of National Historic Landmarks in Ohio
 Listings in neighboring counties: Adams (IN), Auglaize, Darke, Jay (IN), Shelby, Van Wert
 National Register of Historic Places listings in Ohio

References

 
Mercer